Little Evil is a 2017 American supernatural horror comedy film written and directed by Eli Craig. It stars Adam Scott, Evangeline Lilly, Owen Atlas, Bridget Everett, Kyle Bornheimer, Chris D'Elia, Donald Faison, Carla Gallo, Tyler Labine, Brad Williams, Clancy Brown, and Sally Field. It was released by Netflix on September 1, 2017.

Plot
Gary Bloom marries Samantha, who has a 5-year-old son, Lucas. Gary struggles to connect with the quiet Lucas, who ignores him. Gary receives a telephone call from his wedding videographer Karl, warning that something very unusual is in the footage, but Gary is uninterested. Gary stops by one of his properties for sale, an old nunnery, where Father J.D. Gospel, the leader of a Doomsday cult, buys it on the spot. Gary is summoned to Lucas’ school where the principal informs him that Lucas spoke out of turn in class and told his science teacher to “go to hell”, after which she killed herself by jumping out the window and got impaled on a fence. A psychiatrist stresses that Lucas see a counselor and Gary, apparently the main source of Lucas’ erratic behavior, should do the same.

Samantha is upset by the news and feels that everyone, including Gary, is unfairly blaming Lucas, but Gary assures her that he loves them both. At therapy, Gary confides to the other stepfathers, including his friend Al, that he thinks his stepson might be a little evil, and they all sympathize. At Lucas’ birthday party, a clown lights himself on fire, and Gary is led to believe Lucas is responsible. Karl shows Gary the wedding video, revealing a possessed-looking Lucas untouched by a tornado. Karl tells Gary that all Samantha's previous boyfriends are dead except Gabriel, giving Gary Gabriel's address.

When Gary inquires about Lucas' biological father, Samantha reluctantly admits that years earlier, she was part of a cult and Lucas was conceived during a ritual. Gary convinces Al to help him, and they find Gabriel in the basement of a church where he is self-flagellating. Gabriel reveals that Lucas is the Antichrist and tells them to travel to Bethlehem to find Gozamel the demon hunter. Gary and Al view a television news report on rioting due to the Apocalypse in Bethlehem, Pennsylvania, realizing that is where they need to go. They find Gozamel, who informs them they must kill the child with the Knife of Destiny to prevent the end of the world. Gozamel is killed in a car accident, but not before he gives Gary the Knife of Destiny to kill Lucas on hallowed ground.

Gary arrives home to find Samantha with Miss Shaylock, a woman from Child Protective Services. They encourage Gary put Lucas to bed, but this goes horribly wrong, ending in Lucas burying Gary in a sandbox. Samantha digs him up, taking Lucas’ side for being a confused kid, and Gary screams that Lucas is the Antichrist. Samantha is devastated, and Gary apologizes. Convinced Lucas is the Antichrist, Gary takes him on a trip to Waterland, an amusement park blessed by the Pope, intending to drown Lucas in what would appear to be an accident, but Lucas and Gary actually start to bond as father and son. Gary reluctantly equips Lucas with sand-filled floaties and sends him down a water slide to his death, but sees the word "Love" in the sky and takes it as a sign. Gary saves Lucas, taking him for ice cream, and they both apologize for trying to kill each other.

An amber alert for Lucas appears on Gary's phone, and police arrive to arrest Gary as Miss Shaylock, revealed to be a disciple of Father Gospel, takes Lucas. Father Gospel also kidnaps Samantha. Gary escapes to save her and Lucas, with help from the other stepdads. They travel to the old nunnery where Father Gospel and his disciples prepare to kill Lucas and bring about the end of the world. When Lucas opens a tunnel to Hell and starts to fall into it, Gary saves him. Once freed, Samantha knocks Father Gospel into the tunnel. Weeks later, Gary and Lucas race the Okatok Soap Box Derby, finally happy as father and son.

Cast
 Adam Scott as Gary Bloom, Samantha's husband and Lucas's stepfather
 Evangeline Lilly as Samantha Bloom, Gary's wife and Lucas's mother
 Owen Atlas as Lucas, Samantha's son and Gary's stepson
 Bridget Everett as Al, Gary's co-worker and best friend
 Clancy Brown as Reverend Gospel
 Sally Field as Miss Shaylock
 Kyle Bornheimer as Victor
 Chris D'Elia as Wayne
 Donald Faison as Larry
 Carla Gallo as Wendy
 Tyler Labine as Karl C. Miller
 Brad Williams as Gozamel

Production
In May 2013, Universal Pictures acquired the film's script, with Eli Craig directing the film, based upon the screenplay he wrote, while Scott Stuber, Nicholas Nesbitt, would serve as producers under their Mandalay Pictures and Bluegrass Films banners respectively. In September 2016, it was announced Evangeline Lilly, Adam Scott, Clancy Brown, Donald Faison, Chris D'Elia, Bridget Everett, Owen Atlas, Brad Williams, and Marcus Terrell Smith had joined the cast of the film, Dylan Clark and Jason Michael Berman would serve as producers, and Netflix would produce and distribute the film. That same month, Kyle Bornheimer joined the cast of the film.

Filming
Principal photography began in September 2016, in Cleveland, Ohio. The film was shot in 25 days with no reshoots.

Music
Marco Beltrami, Brandon Roberts & Marcus Trumpp compose the score for the film.

Release
It began streaming on Netflix on September 1, 2017.

Critical response
On review aggregator Rotten Tomatoes, the film holds an approval rating of 92% based on 12 reviews, with an average rating of 6.5/10.

References

External links
 
 

2010s comedy horror films
2017 horror films
American comedy horror films
Demons in film
Fictional depictions of the Antichrist
Films shot in Cleveland
Films scored by Marco Beltrami
English-language Netflix original films
Films about Satanism
Backwoods slasher films
2017 comedy films
2010s English-language films
2010s American films